Agonum anchomenoides is a species of ground beetle in the Platyninae subfamily, that can be found in Canada and the United States.

References

External links
Agonum anchomenoides on Bug Guide

Beetles described in 1838
anchomenoides